Goodland is a surname. Notable people with the surname include:

Edward Goodland  (1883–1974), English cricket player
Geoff Goodland (born 1955), American curler
Ken Goodland (born 1940), former Australian rules footballer
Walter Samuel Goodland (1862–1947), Governor of Wisconsin

See also
Alastair Goodlad (born 1943), Baron Goodlad, British Conservative politician